St. George's Church is a parish church in Ptuj, northeastern Slovenia. It was built in the 12th century and in the 15th century redesigned in the Gothic style. Viewed from Slovene Square (the southwest), it is located behind the monolithic Roman tombstone, the  Monument of Orpheus, and the free standing Town Tower. There are Renaissance and Baroque gravestones on the exterior walls of the church. The paintings in the interior were made from the late 13th to the end of the 15th century. In 1863 the church became Provost.

References

External links

Roman Catholic churches in Slovenia
Ptuj
12th-century Roman Catholic church buildings
Gothic architecture in Slovenia
Roman Catholic cathedrals in Slovenia